Feicui Dam is a double curvature concrete arch dam on the Beishi River in Shiding District, New Taipei, Taiwan, forming Feicui Reservoir. The dam is located in Shiding District, New Taipei City, and is usually misunderstood as the principal water source for the Greater Taipei area (In fact, the principal water source for the Greater Taipei area is Nanshi River. Feicui Dam, by contrast, is the water source in reserve). The name of the dam and reservoir translates as "emerald lake", in reference to the pure quality of the water. The area is managed by the Taipei Feicui Reservoir Administration. Public access is heavily restricted in order to protect water quality, which is among the highest of Taiwan's reservoirs.

History
The dam was proposed in the 1970s during a period of severe drought in northern Taiwan. The reservoir site was located on the Beishi River, which joins with the Nanshi River to form the Xindian River which flows through New Taipei City. A dam built here would hold back water during the wet season, when the flow in Nanshi River alone is enough to meet water demands, and release water to augment supplies as needed during the dry season.

This dam site was considered favorable because of good soil and forest conditions of the upstream watershed; at the time human development consisted mainly of tea plantations. The quality was much better than the watershed behind Shihmen Dam, the other major water source for greater Taipei, which has suffered crippling sediment issues due to deforestation. In order to preserve the watershed, the Taiwan government evicted many residents in upstream areas.

Although the Dam is located in New Taipei, construction was funded by Taipei City, in order to provide water to the capital. Construction began in August 1979 and was completed in June 1987. The dam cost NT$11.4 billion to construct. Today about 46 percent of the water is delivered to Taipei City and 54 percent is used in New Taipei. The service area incorporates about 6.3 million people–a quarter of Taiwan's population.

In 2014, the Feicui Reservoir supplied a total of 344.5 million cubic meters (279,300 acre feet) of water for municipal and industrial uses, or about 944,000 cubic meters (249 million gallons) per day.

Specifications
Feicui Dam is the largest concrete dam in Taiwan. Located in a seismically active zone, Feitsui Dam is designed to withstand a magnitude 7.0 earthquake.

The Feicui Reservoir has a water storage capacity of 460 million cubic meters (370,000 acre feet) and an active capacity of 335.5 million cubic meters (272,000 acre feet). The reservoir is operated for water supply, with flood control and hydro power generation as secondary purposes. The main purchasers of water are Taipei Water Department and Taiwan Water Corporation. After the Zengwun Reservoir, Feicui is the second biggest lake in Taiwan.

Hydroelectricity is produced at the Gueishan Power Station, which has one Francis turbine with a capacity of 70 megawatts.

Water is released through three sets of gates. With all gates open the dam can release  of floodwater.

Access

The dam and reservoir are noted for the lack of public access, in order to protect the quality of the drinking water. With the exception of maintenance workers and Taipei City officials, visitation to the dam itself requires a special appointment and must be accompanied by a certified guide. In 2014, a total of 15,798 people toured Feitsui dam compared to 1.7 million people who visited the Shihmen Dam. The closest major road is Provincial Highway 9.

See also

List of dams and reservoirs in Taiwan
List of power stations in Taiwan
Electricity sector in Taiwan

References

External links

Current Feicui Reservoir water level

1987 establishments in Taiwan
Dams completed in 1987
Arch dams
Dams in Taiwan
Buildings and structures in New Taipei
Hydroelectric power stations in Taiwan